The Ben Luc – Long Thanh Expressway, also known as Ho Chi Minh City Ring 3, is an expressway under construction in Ho Chi Minh City, Vietnam.

It was approved in 2010 with an investment value of  VND 31,320 billion (US$1.5 billion), partially funded by a US$636 million Asian Development Bank loan and a VND 10,500 billion (US$450 million) JICA loan. Construction started in 2014, but was delayed due to funding issues. The route includes two large cable-stayed bridges. Construction of the two bridges was suspended since July 2018 due to funding issues over a US$70 million budget overrun. This has delayed the planned completion date from 2018 to 2023.

Bình Khánh bridge 

Bình Khánh bridge has a total length of 2,764 meters and a main span of 375 meters.

Phước Khánh bridge 

Phước Khánh bridge has a total length of 3,186 meters and a main span of 300 meters. It is constructed by the Sumitomo - Cienco4 joint venture.

References

Road transport in Vietnam
Expressways in Vietnam